Joanna Dove Hayes (born December 23, 1976, Williamsport, Pennsylvania) is an American hurdler, who won the gold medal in the 100 metres hurdles at the 2004 Summer Olympics.

She originally specialized in the 400 metres hurdles. She won the silver medal at the 1999 Summer Universiade in a career best time of 54.57 seconds, and the gold medal at the 2003 Pan American Games. She competed at the 1999 World Championships and 2003 World Championships without reaching the final.

From 2004 she competed internationally in the 100 metres hurdles. She finished fourth at the 2004 World Indoor Championships, and in August she won the Olympic gold medal in a career best time of 12.37 seconds. She also won the 2004 World Athletics Final toward the end of the season.

At the 2005 World Championships, she was among the favorites, having run 12.47 seconds in June. She did reach the final race, only to fail to finish after stumbling in the hurdles. She finished third at the 2005 World Athletics Final. After that, mediocre seasons followed with 12.76 (2006), 13.28 (2007) and 12.63 seconds (2008) as her season's best times. She failed to qualify for the 2008 Olympics due to injury.

While in high school at John W. North High School in Riverside, California she won both the 100 meter hurdles (setting the meet record) and 300 meter hurdles at the CIF California State Meet in 1995 and was named the national Girl's "High School Athlete of the Year" by Track and Field News.

She is currently a volunteer assistant coach at the University of Southern California, and has coached there since the 2017 season.  She was the former personal coach (2018-2020) to professional runner and 400m hurdle world recorder holder Sydney McLaughlin. Previously, she was an assistant coach at UCLA from 2014 through 2016, and prior to that she coached track and field and cross country at Harvard-Westlake School in Los Angeles, California. She is the daughter of Los Angeles homeless advocate Ted Hayes. She gave birth to a daughter, Zoe, in December 2010. Hayes began her comeback to competition in 2012.

Hayes was inducted into the UCLA Athletics Hall of Fame on October 11, 2014

References

External links

Joanna Hayes Foundation
Biography.com profile
Read Joanna Hayes' exclusive blog for spikesmag.com

1976 births
Living people
American female hurdlers
Athletes (track and field) at the 1999 Pan American Games
Athletes (track and field) at the 2003 Pan American Games
Athletes (track and field) at the 2004 Summer Olympics
Olympic gold medalists for the United States in track and field
University of California, Los Angeles alumni
UCLA Bruins women's track and field athletes
Sportspeople from Williamsport, Pennsylvania
Track and field athletes from California
Medalists at the 2004 Summer Olympics
Pan American Games gold medalists for the United States
Pan American Games medalists in athletics (track and field)
Universiade medalists in athletics (track and field)
Universiade silver medalists for the United States
Medalists at the 1999 Summer Universiade
Medalists at the 2003 Pan American Games